Rachel Judith Weil (born 1959) is a teacher and scholar, specializing in gender and culture in 17th and 18th century England. She is currently a professor of early modern English political and cultural history in the Department of History at Cornell University in Ithaca, NY.

Life
Weil received her B.A. degree from Brown University in 1981 and her Ph.D. from Princeton University in 1991 with a dissertation titled "Sexual Ideology and Political Propaganda in England 1680-1714". She has continued scholarly studies of the historical relationship of sexuality and politics in such essays as "Sometimes a Scepter is Only a Scepter: Pornography and Politics in Restoration England" (1993). Weil later published Political Passions: Gender, the Family & Political Argument in England 1680-1714 (1999), an examination of the political implications of family and gender relationships in early modern English history. Her most recent work concerns early modern English political intrigue and conspiracy.

Books
A Plague of Informers: Conspiracy and Political Trust in William III's England (Yale University Press, 2014)
Political Passions: Gender, the Family and Political Argument in England, 1680-1714 (Manchester University Press 1999),

References

1959 births
Living people
21st-century American historians
Cornell University Department of History faculty
American women historians
21st-century American women writers